Australia competed at the 2010 Commonwealth Games in Delhi, India.

Medallists

| style="text-align:left; width:78%; vertical-align:top;"|

| style="text-align:left; vertical-align:top;"|

Archery

Australia's archery team consists of 12 archers over 8 events

Men

Women

Athletics

Men's track

* : took part in heats only

Men's field

Women's track

Women's field

Paralympic athletics

Badminton

Men

Women

Mixed

Boxing

Cycling

Men's road

Women's road

Men's track
Pursuit

Sprint

Time trial

Points race

Keirin

Women's track
Pursuit

Sprint

Time trial

Points race

Diving

Australia's diving team consists of 12 divers

Men

Women

Gymnastics

Men's artistic
Team

Individual

Women's artistic
Team

Individual

Rhythmic

Hockey

Men

Semi-final

Gold-medal match

Women

Semi-final

Gold-medal match

Lawn Bowls

Netball

 Goal percentage (G%) = 100 × GF/GA. Accurate to one decimal place.
 Highlighted teams advanced to the medal playoffs; other teams contested classification matches.

Rugby sevens

Gold-medal bracket

Shooting

Men

Women

Squash

Men

Women

Mixed

Swimming

Australia's swimming team consists of 53 swimmers over 44 events.

Men

* : took part in heats only.

Women

Paralympic swimming

Synchronized swimming

Australia's synchronized swimming team consists of 3 swimmers over 2 events.

Table tennis

Men

Women

Tennis

Men

Women

Mixed

Weightlifting

Wrestling

Men's freestyle

Women's freestyle

Greco-Roman

Controversies

Wrestling
Wrestler Hassene Fkiri was disqualified and stripped of the silver medal after making an obscene gesture at the international FILA judges during the final.

Washing machine thrown from games village
Australian athletes have been accused of vandalizing the towers of the athletes' village they were staying in by breaking furniture and electrical fittings. Delhi Police did not press the case after the Organizing Committee refused to file a complaint while Indian external affairs minister SM Krishna dismissed it as a one-off incident.
A unnamed member of the team was sent home early.

A washing machine was hurled from the eighth floor of the same tower. Nobody on the ground was hit, but it is unclear who the culprit was. Indian newspapers have reported that the Australian Commonwealth Games Authority agreed to pay for the damages and have apologised for the incident. The Australian High Commissioner rejected the claim, stating that the incident was the result of partying and celebrations. Later comments by Australian officials have contradicted claims by Lalit Bhanot that they had admitted responsibility. Perry Crosswhite said that it was still unclear if athletes from other nations present in the tower at the time had been responsible.

See also
 Australia at the 2008 Summer Olympics
 Australia at the 2012 Summer Olympics

References

2010
Nations at the 2010 Commonwealth Games
Commonwealth Games